Richard Bignell may refer to:

Richard Bignell, member of the Doctor Who Restoration Team
Richard Bignell, British Rugby Union footballer, currently playing for Moseley Rugby Football Club
Richard Bignell, former head master of Exhall Grange School in Coventry, United Kingdom

See also
 Bignell (disambiguation)